is a district located in Kōchi Prefecture, Japan.

As of the January 1, 2005 merger but with 2003 population estimates, the district has an estimated population of 5,348 and a density of 17.4 persons per km2. The total area is 307.39 km2.

Towns and villages
Tosa
Ōkawa

Mergers
On October 1, 2004 the village of Hongawa, along with the village of Gohoku, from Agawa District, merged into the expanded town of Ino, in Agawa District.
On January 1, 2005 the villages of Kagami and Tosayama merged into the expanded city of Kōchi.

Districts in Kochi Prefecture